The 2015–16 season was Liverpool Football Club's 124th season in existence and their 54th consecutive season in the top flight of English football. It was also the club's 24th consecutive season in the Premier League. Along with the Premier League, Liverpool competed in the FA Cup, Football League Cup and UEFA Europa League. The season covered the period from 1 July 2015 to 30 June 2016. It started with a 1–0 away win against Stoke City in the league and ended with a 1–3 defeat to Sevilla in the UEFA Europa League Final.

The season was the first since 1997–98 without former captain Steven Gerrard, who departed to LA Galaxy.

Season review

Pre-season
On 10 July 2015, Jordan Henderson was announced as the new captain of Liverpool following the departure of Steven Gerrard. The next day, Liverpool travelled to Asia for four pre-season matches with a 30-man squad. They played their first match of the pre-season on 14 July against Thai Premier League XI and won the match comfortably with the score of 4–0 in which Lazar Marković, Mamadou Sakho, Adam Lallana and Divock Origi scored a goal each. On 17 July, Adam Lallana and James Milner scored a goal apiece in a 2–1 win over Brisbane Roar. On 20 July, Liverpool won 2–0 against Adelaide United with goals from James Milner and Danny Ings.

For the fourth game, Liverpool travelled to Malaysia to face Malaysia XI and the match finished a goal apiece with goals from Patrick Wleh and Jordon Ibe. On 1 August, Liverpool played against the Finnish side HJK Helsinki and won the match 2–0 with goals from Divock Origi and Philippe Coutinho. Liverpool played their last match of the pre-season against Swindon Town and won the game 2–1 with goals from debutant Christian Benteke and youngster Sheyi Ojo, who scored the winning goal.

August
On 7 August, James Milner was appointed the vice captain of Liverpool FC. On 9 August 2015, Liverpool won their opening match against Stoke City in the Premier League. Philippe Coutinho scored the winning goal in the 86th minute with a long-range effort which ultimately gave Liverpool a 1–0 win. This victory came at the site of their biggest defeat, when Stoke won 6–1 that May. On 17 August, Liverpool played the second match of the league season at Anfield against AFC Bournemouth in a 1–0 win for Liverpool, in which Christian Benteke scored his first competitive goal for the club. On 24 August, Liverpool played a 0–0 draw with Arsenal at the Emirates Stadium. On 29 August 2015, Liverpool lost the first match of the season against West Ham United in a 3–0 win for the away side. This was West Ham's first victory at Anfield since 1963.

September
On 13 September, Liverpool travelled to Manchester to play against Manchester United and suffered a 3–1 defeat in the latest instalment of their rivalry. On 17 September, Liverpool began their UEFA Europa League campaign with a 1–1 draw away against Bordeaux.  On 21 September, Liverpool played a 1–1 draw with Norwich City at home, with Danny Ings scoring the goal for Liverpool. On 24 September, Liverpool won the third round match of the League Cup via penalties after 1–1 draw in 120 minutes against Carlisle United. Liverpool registered a 3–2 victory over Aston Villa on 27 September with James Milner scoring in the second minute of play and Daniel Sturridge scoring a brace.

October
Liverpool began the first match of the month on 1 October, with yet another 1–1 draw in the Europa league group stage game against Sion, where Adam Lallana scored his second goal in a row in the competition. On 4 October, Liverpool played their 225th Merseyside Derby against Everton with the game ending again in a 1–1 draw, Liverpool's goal coming from Danny Ings. This was the fifth time in Liverpool's previous six games that they had taken a 1–0 lead only to have the game end in a 1–1 draw; they had just one win in their previous nine games.

Just one hour after the game, manager Brendan Rodgers was sacked following the result which left Liverpool in tenth place after eight games. Later, it was known that the decision to sack him had already been made prior to the match against Everton. The following day, Rodgers released a statement through the League Managers Association, stating, "I am, of course incredibly disappointed to be leaving... [but] it has been both an honour and a privilege to manage one of the game's great clubs." On 8 October 2015, former Borussia Dortmund manager Jürgen Klopp agreed a three-year deal to become Liverpool manager, replacing Rodgers. Klopp's debut game was a 0–0 away draw with Tottenham Hotspur on 17 October 2015.

On 22 October, Liverpool settled for a 1–1 score resulting yet another draw, but this time in the Europa League against Rubin Kazan. Liverpool played second consecutive 1–1 draw and third consecutive draw in all competitions on 25 October against Southampton. On 28 October, Liverpool finally ended three consecutive draw spree to win 1–0 against AFC Bournemouth in the fourth round and entered the quarter-finals of the League Cup. Klopp won his first league game against Chelsea on 31 October in a 3–1 win, with a brace from Philippe Coutinho and a goal from Christian Benteke.

November
November began with the Reds' first Europa League win of the season, coming on 5 November in a 1–0 victory over Rubin Kazan, where Jordon Ibe scored his first ever competitive goal for Liverpool. On 8 November, Klopp lost his first game against Crystal Palace in a 2–1 defeat at Anfield. However, the side bounced back after the international break with a 4–1 away win over Manchester City on 22 November, the club's first league win at the Etihad Stadium since 2008. Following this, his side advanced to the knockout stage of the Europa League following a 2–1 win over Bordeaux on 26 November. Liverpool then climbed to sixth in the Premier League table with a 1–0 win over Swansea City thanks to a penalty from James Milner.

December
On 2 December, Liverpool played Southampton away in the quarter-finals of the League Cup. After going 1–0 down in the first minute of play, they produced a remarkable comeback and won 1–6, with a goal from Jordon Ibe, a brace from Daniel Sturridge and a hat-trick from Divock Origi. Liverpool again lost, this time they hilariously suffered a 2–0 away defeat at the hands of Newcastle United on 6 December. Liverpool played a goalless draw in the last match of the Europa League group stage against Sion on 10 December, eventually finishing top of the group. On 13 December, Liverpool played a 2–2 draw against West Bromwich Albion at Anfield, with Origi scoring in the sixth minute of injury time total of eight minutes. On 20 December, Liverpool played against Watford at Vicarage Road and lost 0–3, making it Jürgen Klopp's third loss as Liverpool manager. On Boxing Day, Liverpool played Leicester City and went on to win 1–0 to a Christian Benteke goal in the 63rd minutes of play. On 30 December, Liverpool played their last game of 2015 against Sunderland at the Stadium of Light, where the team won by 1–0.

January
On 2 January, Liverpool lost their first game of 2016 at the Boleyn Ground against West Ham, 2–0, West Ham's first league double against Liverpool in 52 years. On 5 January, Liverpool played Stoke away in the first leg of the semi-finals of the League Cup and won 1–0, with Jordon Ibe scoring. On 8 January, Liverpool played Exeter City in the FA Cup away at St. James Park and drew 2–2, with Jerome Sinclair and Brad Smith scoring. On 13 January, Liverpool played Arsenal at Anfield, the match ending in a 3–3 draw in which Roberto Firmino scored a brace and Joe Allen equalised for Liverpool in the 90th minute. On 17 January, Liverpool lost 1–0 at Anfield to rivals Manchester United, with Wayne Rooney scoring the only goal. On 20 January, Liverpool played Exeter City in the FA Cup third round replay at Anfield, winning 3–0 with goals from Joe Allen, Sheyi Ojo and João Carlos Teixeira. On 23 January, Liverpool played Norwich at Carrow Road and won 5–4, with Adam Lallana scoring a winning goal in stoppage time. On 26 January, Liverpool played the second leg of their League Cup semi-final against Stoke, losing 1–0 on the night but winning the penalty shootout 6–5 and advancing to the final at Wembley Stadium. The win was Liverpool's 11th success in 13 penalty shoot-outs in all competitions. On 30 January, Liverpool played West Ham at home and drew 0–0 in the FA Cup; the two clubs will replay the match on 9 February.

February
On 2 February, Liverpool travelled to the King Power Stadium to play Leicester City, losing 2–0 through goals by Jamie Vardy. On 6 February, Liverpool played Sunderland at Anfield and were leading 2–0 with goals from Roberto Firmino and Adam Lallana, however in the 77th minute, more than 10,000 supporters, led by fan group Spirit of Shankly, staged the first walkout in the club's history in reaction to a proposed increase in ticket prices. Sunderland went on to score two late goals and the match ended in a 2–2 draw. The club and executive Ian Ayre reversed their proposal and issued a formal apology in what was seen as a win for the supporters.

On 9 February, Liverpool travelled to the Boleyn Ground to play West Ham in the FA Cup fourth round replay, losing 2–1; Philippe Coutinho scored a free kick on his comeback from his injury. On 14 February, Liverpool beat Aston Villa 6–0 at Villa Park, with goals scored by Daniel Sturridge, James Milner, Emre Can, Divock Origi, Nathaniel Clyne and Kolo Touré. It was the first time in the Premier League era that Liverpool scored with six different goalscorers in a single match. Midfielder Kevin Stewart made his Premier League debut as a 66th-minute substitute, replacing Coutinho. On 18 February, Liverpool travelled to the WWK Arena in Augsburg to play FC Augsburg, drawing 0–0 in their first leg Europa League tie. On 25 February, Liverpool played the second leg and won 1–0 with a penalty scored by James Milner in the fifth minute, advancing to the round of 16. On 28 February, Liverpool played the Capital One Cup Final at Wembley against Manchester City, losing 3–1 on penalties after the game finished 1–1 after regular and extra time. Philippe Coutinho had scored the game's equaliser in the 83rd minute to send the match to extra time and ultimately penalties. A win would have been Liverpool's ninth League Cup, having last won it in 2012.

March
On 2 March, Liverpool hosted Manchester City just three days after they lost the League Cup final. The match was played at Anfield and was won 3–0 with goals from Adam Lallana, James Milner and Roberto Firmino. On 6 March, Liverpool played Crystal Palace away at Selhurst Park, winning 2–1 with a goal from Roberto Firmino after a mistake by the Palace goalkeeper Alex McCarthy and an injury time penalty from substitute Christian Benteke. On 10 March, Liverpool played Manchester United at Anfield in the Europa League round of 16, winning 2–0 in the first leg with goals from Daniel Sturridge and Firmino. On 17 March, Liverpool travelled to Old Trafford to play United in the tie's second leg and drew 1–1, progressing to next round by prevailing 3–1 on aggregate.

April
On 10 April, Liverpool beat Stoke City 4–1 at Anfield, making it the biggest win of the Jürgen Klopp era at home for Liverpool, with Alberto Moreno and Daniel Sturridge netting once each in the first half, and Divock Origi scoring a brace in the second. On 14 April, Liverpool played Borussia Dortmund in the Europa League quarter-finals second leg at Anfield after a 1–1 away draw in the first leg on 7 April. The match started horribly for Liverpool with the club trailing 2–0 after nine minutes. Early in the second half, Divock Origi scored to cut down the deficit, but Marco Reus put Borussia Dortmund 3–1 up on 57 minutes. With Liverpool requiring three more goals, Philippe Coutinho curled home from the edge of the area, Mamadou Sakho scored his first goal since December 2013 for the club from a corner on 78 minutes and finally, in the first minute of injury time, Dejan Lovren headed in his first goal of the season off James Milner's cross to send Liverpool through 5–4 on aggregate, with Liverpool winning 4–3 on the night. On 17 April, Liverpool beat AFC Bournemouth 1–2 away at Dean Court. Klopp made ten changes to the team which had defeated Borussia Dortmund 4–3, including giving goalkeeper Danny Ward his debut. Roberto Firmino and Daniel Sturridge netted one goal each before Joshua King scored an exceptional consolation goal in the third minute of second-half stoppage time.

On 20 April, Liverpool defeated Everton 4–0 in the second Merseyside Derby of the season. Divock Origi and Mamadou Sakho scored a goal each late in the first half to give Liverpool a half-time lead. In the 50th minute, Ramiro Funes Mori was given a red card following his tackle on Origi which caused Origi's substitution due to an injury sustained as a result of the tackle. Origi's substitute, Daniel Sturridge, and Philippe Coutinho added goals. Liverpool was exceptionally dominant in the game, with 37 shots as opposed to Everton's 3, as well as having 67% of the possession. This win moved Liverpool to seventh. On 23 April, Liverpool welcomed former manager Rafael Benítez to Anfield with his new team, Newcastle, and drew 2–2. Despite leading 2–0 at half-time through goals by Daniel Sturridge and Adam Lallana, the lead was cancelled out by a Papiss Cissé header when goalkeeper Simon Mignolet failed to clear a cross and a Jack Colback's low strike which took a huge deflection. Mamadou Sakho was not available for selection as UEFA was conducting an investigation into a possible doping violation; he was replaced by Kolo Touré. On 28 April, UEFA had announced the suspension of Sakho for a provisional period of 30 days following a positive drug test. On the same day, Liverpool travelled to El Madrigal to play Villarreal, but were downed by a late goal from substitute Adrián in the 92nd minute to lose 1–0.

May
On May Day, Liverpool travelled to Swansea at the Liberty Stadium with a much-changed squad, enduring a horrid start after conceding two goals in the first half, the first from an André Ayew header and the second from a Jack Cork strike. Christian Benteke nodded in to peg one for the visitors but Ayew's second goal ended all hopes for a comeback; the game ended in a 3–1 loss. On 5 May, Liverpool played Villarreal at Anfield in the Europa League and won 3–0 through an own goal by Bruno Soriano and two goals by Daniel Sturridge and Adam Lallana. This ensured qualification to the competition's final after an aggregate scoreline of 3–1. On 8 May, Liverpool played Watford and won 2–0 at home, goals coming from Joe Allen after a knock-down by Benteke, as well as a solo effort by substitute Roberto Firmino. On 11 May, Liverpool played Chelsea and drew 1–1, marking Klopp's 50th game in charge and also the last home game of the season. Chelsea opened the scoring through Eden Hazard's marvelous shot on target, but the match was equalised in the dying moments after a Benteke header, capitalising on an error by goalkeeper Asmir Begović. On 15 May, Liverpool played West Brom away and drew 1–1, marking Liverpool's last game of the Premier League season. Jordan Ibe's strike in the 23rd minute secured a point from the game.

Liverpool ended the season in eighth position and did not qualify for any European competition based on league standings. On 18 May, Liverpool played Sevilla in the Europa League final and lost 1–3 with the lone goal coming from Sturridge in the first half of the game. After the game, Klopp took full responsibility for the loss, saying, "Tonight we couldn't reach the level and it is my job to help the boys use these opportunities. I am responsible for this performance too, so no criticism for my players tonight." Liverpool fans and pundits took to social media to slam Alberto Moreno's performance, and even a request for Klopp to buy a new left back from Liverpool legend Jamie Carragher. Former Liverpool greats Michael Owen and Steve McManaman also hit out at left-back Moreno following his calamitous display.

First team
As it stands on 18 May 2016

Last updated on 17 May 2016

New contracts

Transfers and loans

Transfers in

Transfers out

Loans in

Loans out

Transfer summary

Spending

Summer:  £73,800,000

Winter:  £5,100,000

Total:  £78,900,000

Income

Summer:  £57,450,000

Winter:  £0

Total:  £57,450,000

Expenditure

Summer:  £16,350,000

Winter:  £5,100,000

Total:  £21,450,000

Friendlies

Pre-season

Competitions

Overall

Overview

{| class="wikitable" style="text-align: center"
|-
!rowspan=2|Competition
!colspan=8|Record
|-
!
!
!
!
!
!
!
!
|-
| Premier League

|-
| FA Cup

|-
| League Cup

|-
| Europa League

|-
! Total

Premier League

League table

Results summary

Results by matchday

Matches

On 17 June 2015, the fixtures for the forthcoming season were announced.

FA Cup

League Cup

UEFA Europa League

Group stage

On 28 August 2015, the draw for the group stage was made in Monaco. Liverpool were drawn with Rubin Kazan, Bordeaux and Sion.

Knockout phase

Round of 32

Round of 16

Quarter-finals

Semi-finals

Final

Squad statistics

Appearances
Numbers in parentheses denote appearances as substitute.
Players with no appearances not included in the list.

Goalscorers

Includes all competitive matches.

Captains
Includes all competitive matches. The list is sorted by shirt number when total appearances as captain are equal. Only includes players who started games as captain.

Clean sheets
Includes all competitive matches. The list is sorted alphabetically by surname when total clean sheets are equal.

Correct as of matches played on 18 May 2016

Summary

Disciplinary record

Club awards

End-of-season awards
The 2016 Liverpool FC Players’ Awards event was held at the Exhibition Centre on 12 May 2016.

Liverpool Players Player of the Year Award: Philippe Coutinho
Liverpool Supporters Player of the Year Award: Philippe Coutinho
Liverpool Supporters Young Player of the Year Award: Emre Can
Goal of the Season Award: Philippe Coutinho (vs. Manchester United, 17 March 2016)
Performance of the Year: Philippe Coutinho (vs. Manchester City, 21 November 2015)
Academy's Players’ Player of the Year: Brad Smith
Liverpool Ladies FC Players’ Player of the Season: Martha Harris
Lifetime Achievement Award: Steve Heighway
Bill Shankly Community Award: Marie Rooney from Anfield Sports and Community Centre
Supporters’ Club of the Year: Gauteng, South Africa
Staff Recognition Award: Terry Forsyth

Liverpool Standard Chartered Player of the Month award
Awarded monthly to the player that was chosen by fans voting on liverpoolfc.com

References

Liverpool F.C. seasons
Liverpool
Liverpool